Luigi Albore Mascia (born 8 September 1965 in Pescara) is an Italian politician.

He was a member of the centre-right party The People of Freedom and served as Mayor of Pescara from 8 June 2009 to 15 June 2014. Mascia ran for a second term at the 2014 elections but lost to the Democratic Party candidate Marco Alessandrini.

See also
2009 Italian local elections
List of mayors of Pescara

References

External links
 

1965 births
Living people
Mayors of Pescara
Forza Italia (2013) politicians
The People of Freedom politicians